The men's slalom at the 2003 Asian Winter Games was held on 2 February 2003 at the Owani Onsen Ski Area in Japan.

Schedule
All times are Japan Standard Time (UTC+09:00)

Results
Legend
DNF — Did not finish
DNS — Did not start
DSQ — Disqualified

References

Results

External links
Schedule

Men slalom